The 24th running of the La Flèche Wallonne Féminine started and finished in Huy. The route featured eight categorized climbs, including two ascents of the Mur de Huy. The finish line was on the top of the final ascent of the Mur. Anna van der Breggen won the race for the seventh consecutive time.

Route
The women's race started and finished in Huy, and covered the same final 90km as the men's race, totalling 130.2 km.

There were 8 categorised climbs:
54.2 km: Côte de Thon - 1.1 km climb at 6.9%
63.3 km: Côte de Groynne - 2.1 km climb at 5%
68.8 km: Côte de Haute-Bois - 1.1 km climb at 7.9%
83.2 km: Côte de Gives - 1.4 km climb at 7.7%
98.5 km: Mur de Huy - 1.3 km climb at 9.6%
111.1 km: Côte d'Ereffe - 2.1 km climb at 5%
120.6 km: Côte du Chemin des Geuses - 1.8 km climb at 6.5%
130.2 km: Mur de Huy - 1.3 km climb at 9.6%

Teams
Nine UCI Women's WorldTeams and fifteen UCI Women's Continental Teams competed. 

UCI Women's WorldTeams

 
 
 
 
 
 
 
 
 

UCI Women's Continental Teams

Results

See also
 2021 in women's road cycling

References

La Fleche Wallonne Feminine
La Flèche Wallonne Feminine
La Fleche Wallonne Feminine
La Flèche Wallonne Féminine